Hanover Public School District is a small, urban, public school district located in York County in the borough of Hanover, Pennsylvania. According to 2000 federal census data, Hanover Public School District served a resident population of 14,535. In 2010, the United States Census Bureau reported the District's population had increased to 15,307 people. The educational attainment levels for the Hanover Public School District population (25 years old and over) were 84.8% high school graduates and 16.5% college graduates.

According to the Pennsylvania Budget and Policy Center, 66.9% of the District's pupils lived at 185% or below the federal poverty level as shown by their eligibility for the federal free or reduced price school meal programs in 2012. In 2009, the Hanover Public School District residents’ per capita income was $20,516, while the median family income was $45,156. In the Commonwealth, the median family income was $49,501 and the United States median family income was $49,445, in 2010. In York County, the median household income was $57,494. By 2013, the median household income in the United States rose to $52,100.

Hanover Public School District operates five schools:
Hanover High School (Pennsylvania)
Hanover Middle School
Washington Elementary School
Hanover Street Elementary School
Clearview Elementary School

High school students may choose to attend York County School of Technology for training in computer services, culinary arts, cosmetology, architectural design and the construction and mechanical trades. The Lincoln Intermediate Unit IU12 provides the District with a wide variety of services like specialized education for disabled students and hearing, speech and visual disability services and professional development for staff and faculty.

Extracurriculars
Hanover Public School District's students have access to a variety of clubs, activities and an extensive sports program.

Sports
The District funds:

Boys
Baseball – AA
Basketball- AA
Football – AA
Golf – AA
Soccer – A
Tennis – AA
Track and Field – AA
Wrestling – AA

Girls
Basketball – AA
Field Hockey – AA
Soccer (Fall) – A
Softball – AA
Girls' Tennis – AA
Track and Field – AA
Volleyball – AA

Middle School Sports

Boys
Basketball
Cross Country
Football
Soccer
Track and Field
Wrestling	

Girls
Basketball
Cross Country
Field Hockey
Soccer
Track and Field
Volleyball 

According to PIAA directory July 2012

References

School districts in York County, Pennsylvania